Hamon ng Kalikasan is a Philippine television magazine show broadcast by GMA News TV. Hosted by Nathaniel Cruz, it premiered on September 20, 2012.

The show concluded on December 13, 2012.

Overview
The program features some of the natural phenomena that experienced in the Philippines and around the world.

References

2012 Philippine television series debuts
2012 Philippine television series endings
Disaster television series
Documentary films about natural disasters
Filipino-language television shows
GMA Integrated News and Public Affairs shows
GMA News TV original programming
Philippine documentary television series